Chan Siu-hung,  is a Hong Kong engineer and politician who is the managing director in China of the CLP Group. He is also a member of the Legislative Council for the Election Committee constituency which was newly created under the electoral overhaul imposed by Beijing, and an adjunct professor of the City University of Hong Kong.

In July 2022, Chan tested positive for COVID-19.

Electoral history

References 

Living people
Year of birth missing (living people)
HK LegCo Members 2022–2025
Hong Kong pro-Beijing politicians